Anthony Pengel (born July 10, 1976), known professionally as U-Niq, is a Dutch rapper from Rotterdam. He was part of the rap group The Most Official.

Originally interested in football (he was a youth player for Feyenoord), U-Niq began rapping at age 13, influenced by Rakim and Big Daddy Kane. His 1999 debut album Married to Music was released by Sony. While spending some time in jail (he did not disclose why, and says he was acquitted), he decided to rap in Dutch; his first Dutch-language album, Rotterdam, was released by Dutch hip-hop label TopNotch and contained the singles "Rotterdam" and "Klein klein jongetje".

Discography

Albums 

|-
|align=left|Married to Music||2000||-||||||
|-
|align=left|Rotterdam||2006||15-07-2006||78||1||
|-
|align=left|Het kapitalisme||2008||08-03-2008||31||2||
|-
|align=left|Scheepsrecht||2011||16-04-2011||38||1*||
|}

Singles 

|-
|align="left"|"I Used to Cry"||1999||-||||||
|-
|align="left"|"Married to Music"||1999||-||||||
|-
|align="left"|"Yours Exclusive"||2000||-||||||
|-
|align="left"|"Wildin' Out"||2001||-||||||
|}

EPs 
 2007 Muziek

Other 
With other artists

Compilations

Awards and nominations

References

1976 births
Living people
Dutch rappers
Dutch people of Surinamese descent
Musicians from Rotterdam